In mathematics, the Haran diamond theorem gives a general sufficient condition for a separable extension of a Hilbertian field to be Hilbertian.

Statement of the diamond theorem 

Let K be a Hilbertian field and L a separable extension of K. Assume there exist two Galois extensions 
N and M of K such that L is contained in the compositum NM, but is contained in neither N nor M. Then L is Hilbertian.

The name of the theorem comes from the pictured diagram of fields, and was coined by Jarden.

Some corollaries

Weissauer's theorem 

This theorem was firstly proved using non-standard methods by Weissauer. It was reproved by Fried using standard methods. The latter proof led Haran to his diamond theorem.  

Weissauer's theorem 
Let K be a Hilbertian field, N a Galois extension of K, and L a finite proper extension of N. Then L is Hilbertian. 

Proof using the diamond theorem

If L is finite over K, it is Hilbertian; hence we assume that L/K is infinite. Let x be a primitive element for L/N, i.e., L = N(x). 

Let M be the Galois closure of K(x). Then all the assumptions of the diamond theorem are satisfied, hence L is Hilbertian.

Haran–Jarden condition 

Another, preceding to the diamond theorem, sufficient permanence condition was given by Haran–Jarden:
Theorem. 
Let K be a Hilbertian field and N, M two Galois extensions of K. Assume that neither contains the other. Then their compositum NM is Hilbertian.

This theorem has a very nice consequence: Since the field of rational numbers, Q is Hilbertian (Hilbert's irreducibility theorem), we get that the algebraic closure of Q is not the compositum of two proper Galois extensions.

References 
.
.

Galois theory
Theorems in algebra
Number theory